Girl Power! Live in Istanbul was a two-night concert by British girl group the Spice Girls. The concerts, which were organized by Pepsi as part of the group's sponsorship deal, were performed at the Abdi İpekçi Arena in Istanbul, Turkey on 12 and 13 October 1997.

Broadcast

In the UK, highlights from the concert were broadcast on ITV on 25 December 1997 under the title "Spice Up Your Christmas!". The Christmas Day broadcast included a Christmas message by the group.

In the US, an airing of the full concert was first made available as a pay-per-view event on 17 January 1998 at 9 p.m. (E.T.) via Showtime Event Television. The broadcast was titled Spice Girls In Concert: Wild!. The pay-per-view event was "hugely successful" and the concert subsequently premiered on Showtime's main channel on April 5, 1998.

The concert was aired again in the US on Fox Family Channel on Sunday, 16 August 1998 at 6:00 PM. The broadcast was titled Spice Girls—Wild! in Concert and featured trivia before and after commercials and backstage footage in addition to the set list. The show was two hours in length with advertisements and managed to receive a 1.8 Household rating when it aired despite being up against a four-hour Spice Girls MTV special and a different pay-per-view Spice Girls special airing the same weekend. All songs from the set list except for "Naked" were aired during the broadcast. Interestingly, the concert would go on to be aired again on Fox Family Channel nearly a year later, in July of 1999.

Set list
Act 1:
 "If U Can't Dance"
 "Who Do You Think You Are" 
 "Something Kinda Funny"
 "Saturday Night Divas"
 "Say You'll Be There"
 "Step to Me"

Act 2:
 "Naked" 

Act 3:
 "2 Become 1"
 "Stop"
 "Too Much"

Act 4:
 "Spice Up Your Life"
 "Love Thing"
 "Mama"

Encore:
 "Move Over"
 "Wannabe"

Tour dates

Video release
Following the concert, a VHS of the concert was released but did not include all of the songs on the set list, omitting "Something Kinda Funny", "Saturday Night Divas", "Stop", "Too Much", "Love Thing" and "Mama".  The VHS, however, includes interviews with the girls and backstage footage. Although the original concert was completely live, studio vocals were dubbed into several songs for the video version of the performance.

A DVD of the concert was made available in the UK on December 10, 2007, to coincide with the release of the Greatest Hits album and their reunion Return of the Spice Girls tour. It features the "Girl Talk" documentary, a countdown to the concert, and the 9-song concert, as previously available on VHS.

Personnel

Vocals 

Melanie Brown
Emma Bunton
Geri Halliwell
Victoria Beckham
Melanie C

Band 

Simon Ellis – Musical Director / Keyboards
Andy Gangadeen – Drums
Paul Gendler – Guitars
Fergus Gerrand – Percussion
Steve Lewinson – Bass
Michael Martin – Keyboards

Certifications

References

Spice Girls concert tours
1997 concert tours
Spice Girls video albums